Princess Pring (also known as Princess Pring in the Birthday Kingdom) is a Korean media franchise created in 2012 by Korean toy company Loco Entertainment. The franchise features the titular character Princess Pring, a Rabbit Girl who cheers up children during their birthdays, sometimes helping them with their problems in the most fun of ways.

A musical fantasy animated series based on the franchise is produced by the company and aired on KBS1 from December 19, 2015, to July 16, 2016. A second season is currently in development for a 2018 release. A spinoff based on the series called Celebrina in Birthday Wishland is scheduled to be released globally in 2019.

History
The franchise was created by Loco Entertainment in 2012 with funding from the Korea Creative Content Agency as part of both the "New Character Business Support" and "Character Life Project" for a variety of character goods such as toys, plush toys, publishing and cutlery. It also received praise in the Seoul Character Licensing Fair in 2013 and 2014. On December 31, 2014, KBS Kids aired a special based on the series and, in May 2015, investments from KTH were made for funding a full series. The series was later made and broadcast on KBS1 from December 19, 2015, to July 16, 2016. The animated series, which is animated purely in CGI, is in the style of a musical adventure, with songs composed by Hwang Gun-dan of ButterFly music studios, with the music played by a real orchestra. Producer Yang Hyeon-jin has explained that both music and animation synergize together in the series to reflect the tone of each scene.

Animax Korea also aired the series in South Korea in 2016. The series's second season was officially announced, and will be released in 2018.

Story
The Birthday Kingdom is a special place where children are invited to during their birthday to celebrate, greeted by the kingdom's Crown Princess, Princess Pring. She herself listens to the children's wishes with her big ears and usually helps them in the most fun ways possible, whenever they feel sad or lonely. But she is not alone in the Birthday Kingdom, as such she was assisted by her friends to help the children to support their dreams and their future. Pring makes sure that everything is "Everyday Birthday!".

References

External links
  
 Official Naver Blog 

2015 South Korean television series debuts
2016 South Korean television series endings
2010s South Korean animated television series
2010s animated comedy television series
2010s toys
South Korean children's animated comedy television series
South Korean children's animated fantasy television series
Computer-animated television series
Animated television series about rabbits and hares
Toy brands
Mass media franchises
Animated preschool education television series
2010s preschool education television series
Korean Broadcasting System original programming